The Biblioteca Forteguerriana is a public library in Pistoia, Italy, founded in 1473 by Niccolò Fortiguerra. In 1967 it became the Biblioteca comunale Forteguerriana. It currently occupies the Palazzo della Sapienza (built in 1533).

See also
 Books in Italy

References

This article incorporates information from the Italian Wikipedia.

Further reading

External links
 Official site

Libraries in Pistoia
1473 establishments
Libraries established in the 15th century